Uudeküla is a village in Tapa Parish, Lääne-Viru County, in northeastern Estonia.

Uudeküla Bulldogs RFC is a rugby union club based in Uudeküla.

References

 

Villages in Lääne-Viru County